The Italy national athletics team represents Italy at the international athletics competitions such as Olympic Games or world athletics championships.

Medal count
When there is  updated to 31 January 2022.

Caps
Updated at the 2013 Mediterranean Games (29 June 2013).

Men
Vittorio Visini, with 67 caps, is the Italian athlete with most appearances in the national team of all-time.

Women
Marisa Masullo (79) and Agnese Maffeis (73) are the Italian women with more appearances.

Multiple medalists
Athletes in the table have won at least two gold medals. In bold those still active.

Most winning racewalkers

Where is - he/she never participated because the competition did not exist when he/she was competing. In blod still active athletes.

Diamond League

Italian victories
2021 Diamond League: Gianmarco Tamberi (high jump)
2022 Diamond League: Gianmarco Tamberi (high jump)

Italian podiums
Italian team athletes have reached 28 podiums, including 6 victories in the Diamond League. 

Gianmarco Tamberi was the first Italian to win the Diamond League Crown in 2021.

Olympic Games

21 of the 65 medals came from race walk.

Technic commissioners
This is the list of technic commissioners of Italy's national athletics team.

1933/34: Ove Andersen, Martti Jarvinen, Paavo Karikko, Veikko Renko (men) 
1935/39: Boyd Comstock (men/women) 
1946/47: Lidia Bongiovanni (women) 
1946/61: Giorgio Oberweger (men) 
1962/63: Lauro Bononcini (men): Augusto Lorenzoni (women) 
1964/68: Giorgio Oberweger (men/women) 
1969: Alessandro Calvesi (men): Marcello Pagani (women) 
1970: Marcello Pagani (men/women) 
1971/74: Bruno Cacchi (men/ women) 
1975/86: Enzo Rossi (men); Sandro Giovannelli (women) 
1987/88: Enzo Rossi (men): Elio Locatelli (women) 
1989/94: Elio Locatelli (men/women) 
1995/00: Giampaolo Lenzi (men); Dino Ponchio (women) 
2001/04: Roberto Frinolli (men); Augusto D’Agostino (women) 
2005: Nicola Silvaggi (men/women) 
2008/2012 Francesco Uguagliati (men/women)
2013/2016: Massimo Magnani
2017/2018: Elio Locatelli (2)
2019-: Antonio La Torre

See also
Athletics in Italy
Naturalized athletes of Italy
Italy national relay team
Italian team at the running events
Italy at the Olympics
Italian records in athletics
FIDAL Hall of Fame

References

External links
 Italy's Medals and Top Athletes at Athletics Podium
 Italy Athletics at Summer Olympics
 MANIFESTAZIONI INTERNAZIONALI ITALIANI SUL PODIO – 1908-2011 

 
National team
Italy